Bommelerwaard is a district in Gelderland, Netherlands.

The Bommelerwaard is situated among three rivers: the Meuse in the south(east), the Waal in the north and the Afgedamde Maas in the west. It is formed by the area of two municipalities: Zaltbommel and Maasdriel.

Regions of the Netherlands
Regions of Gelderland